Tawerettenru was an ancient Egyptian queen of the Twentieth Dynasty; the Royal Wife of Ramesses V.

Tawerettenru's estate is mentioned in the Wilbour Papyrus, a document dated to the reign of Ramesses V. Based on this document, Tawerettenru is thought to be a wife of this King, but it is possible she dates to an earlier period.

Grajetzki gives the hieroglyphs as transcribed from hieratic as follows:
 M23-t:n-G7-N41:t*N33-G7-Z5-Z5-Z5-Z5-Z5-Z5-Z5-Z5-t:A-G36:r-t:Y1-U33-n:Z2-r-V1-G7

Sources

12th-century BC Egyptian women
Queens consort of the Twentieth Dynasty of Egypt
Ramesses V